Holistic nursing is a way of treating and taking care the patient as a whole body which involves physical, social environment, psychological, cultural and religious beliefs. There are many theories that support the importance of nurses approaching the patient holistically and how education on this are there to support the goal of holistic nursing. The important skill to be used in holistic nursing would be communicating skills with patients and other practitioners. This emphasizes that patients being treated would be treated not only their body but also mind and spirit.. Holistic nursing is a nursing speciality concerning the integration of one's mind, body, and spirit with his or her environment. This speciality has a theoretical basis in a few grand nursing theories, most notably the science of unitary human beings, as published by Martha E. Rogers in An Introduction to the Theoretical Basis of Nursing, and the mid-range theory Empowered Holistic Nursing Education, as published by Dr. Katie Love. Holistic nursing has gained recognition by the American Nurses Association (ANA) as a nursing specialty with a defined scope of practice and standards. Holistic nursing focuses on the mind, body, and spirit working together as a whole and how spiritual awareness in nursing can help heal illness. Holistic medicine focuses on maintaining optimum well-being and preventing rather than just treating disease.

Core values

The Holistic philosophy: theory and ethics 
Holistic nursing is based on the fundamental theories of nursing, such as the works of Florence Nightingale and Jean Watson as well as alternative theories of world connectedness, wholeness, and healing. Holistic nurses respect the patient as the decision-maker throughout the continuum of care. The holistic nurse and patient relationship is based on a partnership in which the holistic nurse engages the patient in treatment options and healthcare choices. The holistic nurse seeks to establish a professional and ethical relationship with the patient in order to preserve the patient's sense of dignity, wholesomeness, and inner worth.

Theories of Holistic Nursing 
The goal for holistic nursing is in the definition of holistic where it is to treat the patient in whole not just physically. Various nursing theories have helped on viewing the importance holistic nursing. These theories may differ on the views of holistic nursing care but have common goal which is to treat the patient in whole body and mind. One of the theories is The Intersystem Model, explaining that individuals are holistic being therefore their illness are interacted and adapted them as a whole not just physically. Also as health can be a different value to individuals which ranges constantly from well-being to disease. For example, despite their chronic condition the patient is satisfied with the changed healthy life for their living. In holistic nursing knowing the theory does not mean that this will be implanted in doing in real life practice many nurses are not able to apply the theory in real life.

Holistic caring process 
Holistic nursing combines standard nursing interventions with various modalities that are focused on treating the patient in totality. Alternative therapies can include stress management, aroma therapy, and therapeutic touch. The combination of interventions allows the patient to heal in mind, body, and spirit by focusing on the patient's emotions, spirituality, and cultural identity as much as the illness. The six steps of the holistic caring process occur simultaneously, including assessment, diagnosis, outcomes, therapeutic plan of care, implementation, and evaluation. The holistic assessment of the patient can include spiritual, transpersonal, and energy-field assessments in combination with the standard physical and emotional assessments. The therapeutic plan of care in holistic nursing includes a highly individualized and unique plan for each patient. Holistic nurses recognize that the plan of care will change based on the individual patient, and therefore embrace healing as a process that is always changing and adapting to the individual's personal healing journey. Therapies utilized by holistic nurses include stress management techniques and alternative or complementary practices such as reiki and guided imagery. These therapy modalities are focused on empowering individuals to reduce stress levels and elicit a relaxation response in order to promote healing and well-being.

The caring for patients in holistic nursing may differ from other nursing care as some may lack in caring for the patient as a whole, which includes spiritually. In holistic nursing, taking care of the patient does not differ from other nursing, but is focused on mental and spiritual needs as well as physical health. In holistic nursing there should be a therapeutic trust between the patient and nurse, as caring holistically involves knowing the patient’s illness as whole. This can be only done by the patient who is the one to tell the nurse about the social, spiritual and internal illness that they are experiencing. Also as caring could be involved as assertive action, quiet support or even both which assist in understanding a person’s cultural differences, physical and social needs. Through this the nurse is able to give more holistic care to meet the social and spiritual needs of the patient. The attitude of nurse includes helping, sharing and nurturing. In holistic caring there is spiritual care where it needs an understanding of patient’s beliefs and religious views. This is the reason why there should be therapeutic trust between nurse and patient, as in order to understand and respect the patient’s religious beliefs the nurse has to get information from the patient directly which is hard to get when there is not therapeutic trust. There is no specific order or template for how to care holistically, but the principle of holistic caring is to include patient’s social and internal needs and not just focus on treating the physical illness.

Holistic Communication 
Holistic nurses use intentional listening techniques ("Focus completely on the speaker") and unconditional positive regard to communicate with patients. The goal of using these communication techniques is to create authentic, compassionate, and therapeutic relationships with each patient.

In holistic nursing having therapeutic trust with patient and nurse gives great advantage of achieving the goal of treating patients as a whole. Therapeutic trust can be developed by having conversation with the patient. In communication the sender can also become a receiver or vice versa which in holistic nursing the nurses are the receiver of patients concern and the pass the information on to the doctor and do the vice versa. As communication is vital element in nursing it is strongly recommended to nurses to understand what is needed and how to communicate with patients. Communicating with patients can help in the performances of nurses in holistic nursing as by communicating the nurses are able to understand the cultural, social values and psychological conditions. Through this the nurses are able to satisfy the needs of a patients and as well as protecting the nurse for doing their roles as a nurse. In holistic nursing non-verbal communication is also another skill that is taught to nurses which are expressed by gestures, facial expression, posture and creating physical barriers. In holistic nursing as all individuals are not all the same but their social and psychological illness should be treated it is up to the nurse on how they communicate in order to build a therapeutic trust. To achieve the goal of holistic nursing it is important to communicate with the patient properly and to this successfully between the nurse and patient is freakiness and honesty. Without these communicating skills the nurse would not be able to build therapeutic trust and is likely to fail the goal of holistic nursing.

Building a Therapeutic Environment 
Holistic nursing focuses on creating not only a therapeutic relationship with patients but also on creating a therapeutic environment for patients. Several of the therapies included in holistic nursing rely on therapeutic environments to be successful and effective. A therapeutic environment empowers patients to connect with the holistic nurse and with themselves introspectively.

Depending on the environment of where the patient is holistic approach may be different and knowing this will help nurses to achieve better in holistic nursing. For patients with illness, trauma and surgery increasing sleep will benefit in recovery, blood pressure, pain relief and emotional wellbeing. As in hospital there are many disturbances which can effect in patients’ quality of sleep and due to this the patients are lacking in aid for healing, recovery and emotional wellbeing. Nurse being able note or take care of patient’s sleep will determine how closely they are approaching to holistic nursing. Depending on disease some the treatment may differ and may need further check-ups or program for patients to do. For example, there are higher chance for women to get cardiovascular disease but there is less number of enrollment for cardiac rehabilitation program compared to men. This was due to the environment of hospital not being able to support females in completing the CR programs. Some examples are physicians are less likely refer CR programs to women and patient’s thought against safety of the program. In situation like this from the knowledge and education that was done from holistic nursing the nurses will be able to approach the patient as they can relate to what the patient is going thought which gives more comfort and safety to patients in doing the programs.

Cultural Diversity 
Part of any type of nursing includes understanding the patient's comprehension level, ability to cope, social supports, and background or base knowledge. The nurse must use this information to effectively communicate with the patient and the patient's family, to build a trusting relationship, and to comprehensively educate the patient. The ability of a holistic nurse to build a therapeutic relationship with a patient is especially important. Holistic nurses ask themselves how they can culturally care for patients through holistic assessment because holistic nurses engage in ethical practices and the treatment of all aspects of the individual.

Australia has many different cultures as they are many people who were born overseas and migrated to Australia, which we can experience many cultural diversities. Culture can be defined as how people create collective beliefs and shared practices in order to make sense of their lived experiences which how concepts of language, religion and ethnicity are built in the culture. As the meaning of holistic nursing to heal the person as a whole knowing their cultural identities or backgrounds will help to reach the goal (Mariano, 2007). Understanding peoples culture may help to approach treatment correctly to the patient as it provides knowledge to nurses how patient’s view of the concept of illness and disease are to their values and identity. As in holistic approach culture, beliefs and values are essential components to achieve the goal. People’s actions to promote, maintain and restore health and healing are mainly influenced by their culture which is why knowing other cultures will assist in holistic nursing. By developing knowledge, communication, assessment skills and practices for nurses it guides to provide better experiences to patients who have diverse beliefs, values, and behaviors that respects their social, cultural and linguistic needs. As for most patients and families their decision on having treatment against illness or disease are done from cultural beliefs. This means if the nurses are unable to understand and give information relating to what they believe in the patients will most likely reject the treatment and give hardship on holistic nursing.

Holistic Education and Research 
Holistic registered nurses are responsible for learning the scope of practice established in Holistic Nursing: Scope and Standards of Practice(2007) and for incorporating every core value into daily practice. It is the holistic nurse's responsibility to become familiar with both conventional practices as well as alternative therapies and modalities. Through continuing education and research, the holistic nurse will remain updated on all treatment options for patients. Areas of research completed by holistic nurses includes: measurements of outcomes of holistic therapies, measurements of caring behaviors and spirituality, patient responsiveness to holistic care, and theory development in areas such as intentionality, empowerment, and several other topics.

The goal of holistic nursing is treat the patient’s individual’s social, cognitive, emotional and physical problems as well as understanding their spiritual and cultural beliefs. Involving holistic nursing in the education will help future nurses to be more familiar in the terms holistic and how to approach the concept. In the education of holistic nursing all other nursing knowledge is included which once again developed through reflective practice. In holistic nursing the nurses are taught on the five core values in caring, critical thinking, holism, nursing role development and accountability. These values help the nurse to be able to focus on the health care on the clients, their families and the allied health practitioners who is also involved in patient care. Education in holistic nursing is continuous education program which will be ongoing even after graduation to improve in reaching the goal. Education on holistic nursing would be beneficial to nurses if this concept is introduced earlier as repetition of educating holistic nursing could also be the revision of it. There is different education on commutating skills and an example would be the non-verbal and verbal communication with patients. This is done to improve when would the right or wrong to use the communication skill and how powerful skills this could be.

Holistic Nurse Self-Care 
Through the holistic nurse's integration of self-care, self-awareness, and self-healing practices, the holistic nurse is living the values that are taught to patients in practice. Holistic "nurses cannot facilitate healing unless they are in the process of healing themselves."

In order to provide holistic nursing to patient it is also important for nurses to take care of themselves. There are various ways which the nurses can heal, assess and care for themselves such as self-assessment, meditation, yoga, good nutrition, energy therapies, support and lifelong learning. By nurses being able achieve balance and harmony in their lives it can assist to understand how to take care of patient holistically. In Florida Atlantic University there is a program that focus on all caring aspects and recognize how to take care of others as well as on how to start evaluation on their own mind, body and spirit. Also there is Travis’ Wellness Model which explores the idea of “self-care, wellness results from an ongoing process of self-awareness, exploring options, looking within, receiving from others (education), trying out new options (growth), and constantly re-evaluating the entire process. Self-awareness and education precede personal growth and wellness”. This model of concepts shows being able to understand own status of health can benefit to patients and reach the goal of holistic nursing.

Certification 
National certification for holistic nursing is regulated by the American Holistic Nurses Certification Corporation (AHNCC). There are two levels of certification: one for nurses holding a bachelor's degree and one for nurses holding a master's degree. Accreditation through the AHNCC is approved by the American Nurses Credentialing Center (ANCC).

Global initiatives

United States 
American Holistic Nurses Association (AHNA): Mission Statement

"The Mission of the American Holistic Nurses Association is to illuminate holism in nursing practice, community, advocacy, research and education."

Canada 
Canadian Holistic Nurses Association (CHNA): Mission Statement

"To support the practice of holistic nursing across Canada by: acting as a body of knowledge for its practitioners, by advocating with policy makers and provincial regulatory bodies and by educating Canadians on the benefits of complementary and integrative health care."

Australia 
Australian Holistic Nurses Association (AHNA)

"The Mission of the Australian Holistic Nurses Association (AHNA) is to illuminate holism in nursing practice, research, and education; act as a body of knowledge for its practitioners; advocate with policymakers and regulatory bodies; and educate Australians on the benefits of Complementary and Alternative Medicine (CAM) and integrative health care."

See also 
Alternative medicine
Alternative Therapies in Health and Medicine
Journal of Holistic Nursing
Nursing

References 

Nursing specialties
Alternative medicine